San Vito Wetland, is a protected area in Costa Rica, managed under the Pacific La Amistad Conservation Area, it was created in 1994 by decree 22879.

References 

Nature reserves in Costa Rica
Protected areas established in 1994